Wisbech is a former United Kingdom Parliamentary constituency. It was created upon the abolition of an undivided Cambridgeshire county constituency in 1885 and was itself abolished in 1918.

Boundaries

The Redistribution of Seats Act 1885 split the former three-member Cambridgeshire parliamentary county into three single-member divisions. One of these was the Northern or Wisbech Division. During the committee stage of the 1885 bill, the MP for Cambridge University, Henry Raikes made an unsuccessful attempt to rename the constituency as the Northern or Isle of Ely Division.

The constituency consisted of the towns of Chatteris, March, Whittlesey and the Borough and port of Wisbech with the surrounding parishes of Benwick, Doddington, Downham, Elm, Leverington, Littleport, Manea, Newton, Parson Drove, Thorney, Tydd St Giles, Welches Dam and Wimblington.

The area was bounded by the constituencies of Spalding to the north, North West Norfolk and South West Norfolk to the east, the other Cambridgeshire divisions of Newmarket and Chesterton to the south and Ramsey, Peterborough and North Northamptonshire to the west.

This fenland constituency was dominated by a district of Liberal-inclined smallholders. The towns in the division, predominantly Conservative Wisbech and the more Liberal-inclined March, were outvoted by the rural areas.

Upon its abolition under the Representation of the People Act 1918, the constituency formed the bulk of the new parliamentary county of Isle of Ely.

Members of Parliament

Election results

Elections in the 1880s

Elections in the 1890s
Selwyn's resignation caused a by-election.

Brand was appointed Treasurer of the Household, requiring a by-election.

Elections in the 1900s

Elections in the 1910s

Redistribution
The constituency ceased to exist when the Representation of the People Act 1918 redefined constituencies throughout Great Britain and Ireland. The new constituencies followed the boundaries of the administrative counties and county districts created by the Local Government Acts of 1888 and 1894. The historic county of Cambridgeshire had been divided by the legislation into two administrative counties: Cambridgeshire and the Isle of Ely. Each of these, along with the Parliamentary Borough of Cambridge, became single-member constituencies. The whole of the former Wisbech constituency was included in the new Isle of Ely seat, to which were added the City of Ely and surrounding district.

See also
Parliamentary representation from Cambridgeshire
List of former United Kingdom Parliament constituencies

References
 Boundaries of Parliamentary Constituencies 1885-1972, compiled and edited by F.W.S. Craig (Parliamentary Reference Publications 1972)
 Social Geography of British Elections 1885-1910, by Henry Pelling (Macmillan 1967)

Parliamentary constituencies in Cambridgeshire (historic)
Constituencies of the Parliament of the United Kingdom established in 1885
Constituencies of the Parliament of the United Kingdom disestablished in 1918